Balesar is a small village in Uttara Kannada, Karnataka State, India. Administratively, it is under Hasaragod gram panchayat of Siddapura Taluka of Uttara Kannada.

Demographics 
 census, the village of Balesar had 475 inhabitants, with 249 males (52.4%) and 226 females (47.6%), for a gender ratio of 908 females per thousand males.

Notes

External links 
 

Villages in Uttara Kannada district